There are Leaders of the Australian Greens (Greens) at the federal level, as well as in the several member parties which make up the confederation of the Australian Greens.

Background
On Saturday 12 November 2005 at the national conference in Hobart the Australian Greens abandoned their long-standing tradition of having no official leader and approved a process whereby a parliamentary leader could be elected by the Greens Parliamentary Party Room. On Monday 28 November 2005, Bob Brown – who had long been regarded as de facto leader by many inside the party, and most people outside the party – was elected unopposed as the Parliamentary Party Leader.

Most of the Green parties which have joined the Australian Greens do not have a formal leader, and instead they have a shared leadership structure. However, Tasmania, Victoria, and the ACT, have adopted singular leadership structures into their party.

Federal parliamentary leaders
The federal Leaders of the Australian Greens have been as follows:

Federal deputy parliamentary leaders
Shown in chronological order of leadership

Leaders in the Senate

Deputy Leaders in the Senate

Member party leaders

Australian Capital Territory

 No leader (1992–2008)
 Meredith Hunter (2008–2012)
 Shane Rattenbury (2012–present)

New South Wales

 No leader (1984–present)

Northern Territory

 No leader (1990–present)

Queensland

 No leader (1984–present)

South Australia

 No leader (1995–present)

Tasmania

 No leader (1982–1989)
 Bob Brown (1989–1993)
 Christine Milne (1993–1998)
 Peg Putt (1998–2008)
 Nick McKim (2008–2014)
 Kim Booth (2014–2015)
 Cassy O'Connor (2015–present)

Victoria

 No leader (1992–2010)
 Greg Barber (2010–2017)
 Samantha Ratnam (2017–present)

Western Australia

 No leader (1990–present)

References

 
Australian Greens federal leaders
Australian Greens
Australian Greens